Herod's Law (original Spanish title La ley de Herodes) is a 1999 Mexican satirical black comedy political film produced by Bandidos Films; it is a political satire of corruption in Mexico and the long-ruling PRI party (notably the first Mexican film to criticize the PRI explicitly by name and carried some controversy and interference from the Mexican government because of it). The film won the Ariel Award for Best Picture from the Mexican Academy of Film. It was also awarded the Special Jury Prize in Latin American Cinema at the Sundance Film Festival.

Plot

One night, a corrupt mayor enters his office, kills the night watchman, and steals as much money as possible, presumably to disappear with the town's coffers and start a new life elsewhere. He flees into the night, pursued by an angry mob of villagers, who catch him as he stumbles. He pleads with the mob to spare him, but they behead the former mayor out of anger. The next day, The Governor of the PRI party criticizes his Secretary, López, for his failure to keep the villagers in line after he hears about the death of the mayor. In order to save whatever positive reputation the party has, López assures The Governor that he will take care of the issue. After searching numerous candidates for the position of mayor, he and his assistant choose Juan Vargas, a petty and dim witted party member who work as the supervisor of the country's sanitation division. The assistant tracks down Vargas and tells him that López wanted to ask him a favor. Once Vargas arrives at The Secretary's office, he tells Vargas that he has been chosen to be the mayor of San Pedro de los Saguaros, which he immediately accepts and thanks López for giving him tremendous responsibility, a pin representing the party, and his trust. Vargas and his wife Gloria arrive at the town, believing that they are lost. He then asks a man for directions, where he reveals that they arrived at their destination. The man also turns out to be Carlos Pek, the secretary of Vargas. Even though the couple are appalled by the conditions of the town, they nevertheless decide to stay and make the most out of it. At first, the new mayor attempts to do good and genuinely cares about the town, but the villagers grew distrustful of outsiders and the majority of them do not speak Spanish (Pek informs Vargas that due to the previous mayor stealing things from the school, they were unable to pay the teacher and they have no money to repair the school). To make matters worse, he meets Doctor Morales, a former PAN candidate who is angry that he never won the position of mayor and criticizes Vargas for not solving the murder of a villager. He then angrily demands that Vargas shut down the brothel since that's where the murder occurred. He soon arrives at the brothel, where he meets Doña Lupe, the vicious and abusive owner. After attempting to reason with her and seeing that Vargas won't accept the bribe, she angrily tells him to leave and that he should talk with the priest as according to her, he runs the town. Vargas then goes to the church and talk to the priest. He charges Vargas for the prayer and tells him that he should bury the murder victim. When Vargas tells the priest that Doña Lupe told him to talk with the priest in order to resolve disputes, he tells Vargas that it's not in his area and leaves in order to resume work in the church. He then buries the body with the help of Pek, dismayed that he didn't solve the issue.

With no money to modernize the town, Gloria recommends that Vargas seeks financial aid from López. While driving to Mexico City, his car breaks down in the middle of the road. Not long after, he encounters Robert Smith, an American tourist who happens to be in the same area as Vargas. Smith offers to fix the engine for money due to it being a difficult job, which Vargas accepts (He only places a cap in a hole, fixing the problem. We can assume Smith believes that Vargas is very easy to swindle). Once Smith fixes the car, he asks for 100 dollars for "helping out a mexican friend". Vargas insists that he doesn't have money to pay him, but he tells Smith to go to the town and wait for him there, where he will get his payment. Smith accepts, but once Vargas leaves, he curses at him in English. Vargas then laughs, revealing that he outsmarted the American, likely never bothering to keep his promise. Once he arrives at The Capital, López tells Vargas that he can't give out money due to the funds being used for the campaign, but he gives a copy of the constitution of Mexico and a revolver to Vargas and tells him that since he's a politician, he can make the rules and he should use them to his advantage since in his eyes, the only law is Herod's law: literally translated: "either you get screwed or you get fucked" ("o te chingas o te jodes"). Taking his words to heart, Vargas returns to the town and begins using The Constitution in order to gain money for his projects. He then attempts to have Doña Lupe's brothel shut down, but after she begins to attack him, he accidentally shoots her in the leg, crippling her. He then runs away with her cursing at him. Not long after, Pek informs that Doña Lupe wants to talk with Vargas. Once she enters his office, Vargas tries to tell her to respect the laws, but she gives him a huge bribe so she could stay in business. Realizing that he can use this money for modernizing the town, he accepts it with glee. He begins counting the money in order to see if he has enough for fixing the town, but his path to corruption begins when Gloria tells him that he should spend the money on a dinner with the most important people of the town. Despite his reluctance, he accepts his wife's proposal. They begin to kiss until they hear a knock on the door. When Vargas opens the door, he is shocked to see Smith, the man who fixed his car, when he demands his payment. Vargas plays dumb and lets him inside so he can stay at their residence and assures Smith that he'll get his payment tomorrow.

The next day, Vargas and Smith make a deal where Smith would keep 50% of the profits if he helps Vargas with his projects. He then assures Smith that Mexicans always keep their word. At the dinner, Doctor Morales expresses his doubts about Vargas' supposed projects and tells the dinner party that he doesn't believe in his promises. In response, Vargas claims that will the help of Smith, they will bring electricity and prosperity to the town. The dinner party cheers and applauds him for his endeavors, much to the chagrin of Morales. Vargas is then seen raising a power line, where Morales mocks him for after it falls down. Vargas assures him that once completed, Morales will be impressed by his efforts. Gradually, Vargas begins to charge many taxes and imprisons the ones who either can't pay or refuse to cooperate. Vargas then arrives to the brothel in order to get his payments from Doña Lupe, but when she says that she has no money to pay him due to Vargas imprisoning her customers, Vargas works out a compromise where he would have sex with all of her employees. After the experience, he has sex with Gloria in the bathroom, with Smith calling Vargas a lucky dog when he hears noises from upstairs. While napping in his office, Doctor Morales and the priest arrive with Morales expressing disdain when the villagers tell him that Vargas was charging taxes with the threat of imprisonment if they don't comply. Morales then tells Vargas to either stop or that he will hear from him again before leaving. The priest then tells Vargas that he can help him with dealing with Morales if he helps him buy a car. Vargas pays the priest the difference and curses at him after he leaves. When Vargas returns to the brothel, Doña Lupe angrily informs him that their deal is over and summons Pancho, her bodyguard, to beat him up. She then humiliates Vargas by forcing him to act like a pig. When she had her fun, she tells Pancho to beat him up again. When he returns home, his wife asks him how he got his bruises and he tells her that he fell. While both Smith and Gloria are sleeping, Vargas leaves the house in order to get his revenge. He then finds the pair in a garden, where he kills Pancho by shooting his head. Doña Lupe pleads with him to spare her life, but Vargas kills her and kicks her now deceased corpse for insulting him and for being mean to him before dumping their bodies into a ditch. He then frames Filemón, the town drunk, by planting evidence when he's passed out. While he's sleeping, Gloria wakes him up, informing Vargas that she's aware of his affairs with the employees at the brothel. Vargas then realizes that his pin is not on his shirt and returns to the ditch in order to search for it, but to no avail. He arrives at the morgue, where he would find the bodies. Pek informs Vargas that they found the bodies this morning, but they have no suspects or leads. Vargas feigns his feeling for the pair and assures Pek that he won't stop until he finds out who's responsible for the murders.

In order to avoid arousing suspicion, he goes to Doña Lupe's funeral. Once the funeral is finished, the priest asks each person there to pay, but much to his disappointment, the employees inform him that their boss took everything from them. Vargas then shows his condolences for the employees while trying to hug them in a sexual manner. When he asks them when they can resume their relationship, the employees leave without saying a word. Once everyone leaves, Vargas urinates on Doña Lupe's grave in order to humiliate her as she did to him. He then talks with the bar tender of the town and offers him a chance to start another brothel, which he declines. In order to make it look like there is justice, Vargas accuses Morales for murdering Doña Lupe and Pancho since he has grudges against the former owner, but he vehemently denies his involvement. Gloria then tells her husband to apologize to Morales for accusing him, not because she feels that the doctor is innocent, but in order to prevent problems down the road. Vargas then goes to his house in order to apologize, but his wife tells him that he's not inside before having sex with him. Remembering the priest's offer to help, Vargas goes to him, where the priests says that Morales went to Mexico City in order to complain about Vargas. Vargas tells the priest to help him because if he doesn't, Vargas will lose his hold on the town and the priest won't be able to buy his car. The priest then replies that he can help him after charging him a payment. After paying him, Vargas finds out that Morales has been sexually abusing his servant for many years. With this information, Vargas gets the confession from the servant with Pek writing down her testimony, furthering his intent of getting rid of the doctor. Meanwhile, Morales is waiting in the capital in order to talk with López, but his assistant lies to him saying that he's too busy with meetings. Despite insisting that he was waiting for a very long time, he leaves. The assistant then returns to López, where he's waiting for The Governor to call him. Once López receives the call, he informs his assistant that his rival will become the candidate for the position of governor and is worried that they're finished.

Vargas then "tortures" Filemón for information, but he denies killing the pair. When Pek temporarily leaves, Vargas gets a forced confession from the drunk by squeezing his testicles. The scene then cuts to López talking with The Governor about the candidacy with The Governor telling his secretary to "fix it like the old days". Vargas is then seen driving Filemón to the capital in order to imprison him for the murder. It is then revealed that Filemón is aware that Vargas killed them since he saw his pin by the bodies and that he has it. Not wanting any witnesses to his crimes, he gets Filemón drunk and the two stop the car in order to urinate. With the drunk distracted, Vargas shoots him in the head, takes the pin, and dumps his body off the road before returning to the town. In Mexico City, López orders Tiburón and another hitman to deal with the candidate and if anything goes wrong, he will get them out of jail. After the two leave, his assistant expresses concern that the plan will backfire, but López insists that it's the only way to maintain power. At the bar, Vargas becomes drunk, expressing his remorse for killing the drunk with the employees of the brothel and the servant by his side. The women turn off the candles once Vargas falls asleep. The next day, Vargas, now sober, wakes up. He returns to his residence only to find his wife having an affair with Smith. Enraged, Vargas brutally beats up Gloria and holds Smith at gunpoint before Gloria knocks him out. She tells Smith to run while she deals with her husband. Once he regains consciousness, Gloria lies to him by saying that Smith forced her to have sex with him due to him not getting the payment that Vargas promised him. Knowing that she's not telling the truth and being aware of the flirting and sexual intimacy between the two, Vargas calls her a whore while beating her up again and dragging her to the interrogation chamber to chain her up. After the ordeal, Vargas sees the villagers starting a riot with Pek telling him that they are aware of the doctor's sexual abuse of his servant and they want to kill him. Vargas then enters his house and makes an ultimatum: Either he leaves and never comes back or he can spend a long time in prison. Morales and his wife leave the town. Now that his opponent is gone, he instructs Pek to change the laws to that favors the mayor. Not long after, all of the villagers line up with their animals in order to pay their taxes. When one of them says that he doesn't have anything to offer and to give him some time after the harvest, Vargas gets infuriated and orders Pek to throw him in jail. Pek, growing tired of Vargas' corruption, calls him the worst mayor and refuses to help Vargas enslave his people. Vargas holds Pek at gunpoint for embarrassing him and throws him in jail. Vargas then receives news that López is on the run after the police discovers his attempt to eliminate the candidate. He goes to talk with the priest, where he tells Vargas to forgive his wife, which he refuses to do. The priest then explains that some villagers are leaving due to Vargas' actions. Vargas then informs the priest that if he goes down, he's taking him with him as well before leaving. He then unchains his wife so she can cook for him. When Gloria finishes cooking the food, he believes that she tried to poison him and chains her up again.

Once exiting, Tiburón holds him at gunpoint and informs Vargas that López would like to have a word with him. While hearing Pek's complaints, López pretends to care about the troubles caused by Vargas and asks him to explain why the town has not improved. Vargas explained that although he tried his best to help the town, he realized that it was no use when there was no way to save it due to the multiple factors impeding his attempts. He also says that he changed the laws that would suit him the best. Despite López being impressed by Vargas' now ruthless personality and his actions, he demands that he gives him all the riches he has accumulated. He tried to lie to López, but he's aware of the wealth he has. When Vargas tells him that the money's in his residence, López sends Tiburón to escort him in order to prevent any escape. When they arrive at his residence, he finds that his wife has escaped and took all the money. She also left a note saying that she fled to The United States with Smith and that they will see Vargas in hell (It is implied that Smith rescued Gloria while her husband was with López and took the money in order to start a new life together). Angered and saddened by her betrayal, Vargas slits Tiburón's throat before going to López to tell him that the pair took all his money. Angered due to him thinking that Vargas is lying, López demands the money before Vargas points the revolver that he gave him at López's face. He tries to reason with Vargas before he shoots his leg, causing him to stumble. He then proceeds to tell López that he was getting in his way and that according to the advice López gave him earlier, there was no room for the two of them before killing him. Pek then runs away, horrified about the ordeal. Now angry about his misfortune, Vargas loads his revolver, saying that all women are whores and criticizing the mob that is trying to kill him for being savages, for not respecting the law, and for not appreciating his "help". Led by the priest and Pek, the mob begins to surround Vargas. Remembering the power line he had installed earlier, he climbs it in order to avoid the wrath of the villagers. Once on top, he apologizes for his mistakes while Pek orders the mob to topple the power line. Believing he is about to die, Vargas tries to plead with the mob to spare his life until the police that was pursuing López arrive and used their guns to dispel the mob. When the police ask for López's whereabouts, Vargas says that he didn't kill him and pleading for help before the screen goes black.

The next day, Jesus Carnales, the new mayor appointed by the PRI Party, arrives at the town in an eerie fashion where it is almost similar to how Vargas arrived at the town a few days before. When the new mayor asks Pek what happened with his predecessor, he simply says that he has no idea. In Vargas' former office seen at the beginning of the film, it is shown that the assistant of López has been demoted to being a supervisor responsible for sanitation. When as subordinate tells him that the truck broke down again, he tells him to call him "sir" and that he will help him once the speech on the radio is over. He then listens to it with dismay and disbelief.  The film ends with Vargas, now a representative of the PRI party,  making a speech before the Mexican congress and talking about how his party should stay in power, that they're here to assist the nation, and that López's attempts to eliminate the candidate were thwarted by his own hand. The Congress then applauds Vargas for his speech as the now corrupt man basks in their praise.

Cast 
 Damián Alcázar - Juan Vargas, A dimwitted and sincere man who gradually transformed into a ruthless and remorseless dictator
 Pedro Armendáriz Jr. - López, Secretary of The Governor and former boss of Vargas
 Juan Carlos Colombo - The Assistant
 Alex Cox - Robert Smith, the American who help Vargas with his car troubles
 Leticia Huijara - Gloria, the former wife of Vargas
 Isela Vega - Doña Lupe, The owner of the brothel
 Salvador Sánchez - Carlos Pek
 Manuel Ojeda - Bartender
 Ernesto Gómez Cruz - The Governor .
  - Doctor Morales.
 Delia Casanova -  Morales' wife

DVD edition
This movie was released in Region 1 by 20th Century Fox and Venevision Intl. under the banner Cinema Latino in 2004; right now, this edition is out of print.

A second edition was released in 2006 by Warner Home Video with Fernando Sariñana's Todo el poder

A third edition was later released as a dual region issue for Region 1 and Region 4 by Videomax in 2007

References

External links

 DVD review.

1999 films
1990s black comedy films
1990s satirical films
Films directed by Luis Estrada
Mexican satirical films
Mexican political satire films
Mexican black comedy films
1990s Spanish-language films
1999 comedy films
1990s Mexican films